Aefgen Listincx, or Aeff Pietersdochter (died 20 August 1538), was a Dutch Anabaptist and prophet.

Born in Bruges, she was married to the wealthy merchant Gerrit Listincx. In 1525, 1527, 1530 and 1533, she was put on trial for violating the religious laws. In 1535, banned books were found in her possession and her son stated, during an interrogation for heresy, that his mother was in the Anabaptist-ruled Münster. In Münster, Aefgen Listincx was active as a prophet. She was captured after the fall of Münster but released because of her wealth. In 1538, she was put on trial for heresy and executed by burning.

References 

1538 deaths
16th-century Dutch people
Executed Dutch people
Executed Dutch women
People executed for heresy
People from Bruges
Year of birth unknown
People of the Protestant Reformation